Andy Bowen (May 3, 1867 – December 15, 1894) was an American lightweight boxer best known for fighting the world's longest boxing match, which took place in 1893 against Jack Burke.

Biography

Early life
Born on May 3, 1867, in New Orleans, Louisiana, Bowen's first fight was in 1887. He was undefeated in his first 14 fights, with 12 wins and two draws. In September 1890, he successfully defended his title against Jimmy Carroll at the Olympic Club in New Orleans (the same club where James J. Corbett would defeat John L. Sullivan for the World Heavyweight Championship two years later).

The Longest Fight
On April 6, 1893, Bowen and Jack Burke fought the longest fight in history. Bowen had originally scheduled the fight with another opponent, however after dropping out of the fight, Jack Burke, who was the latter's trainer, fought the bout instead. The fight took place at the same Olympics Club Bowen had defended his title from Carroll. The fight lasted 110 rounds over seven hours and 19 minutes (each round lasting three minutes). It was reported that the fight went on for so long, that the spectators who stayed to watch the fight had fallen asleep in their seats. It was also recorded that at round 108, with no clear end in sight, referee John Duffy made the decision that if no winner had emerged in the next 2 rounds, the bout would be ruled a "no contest". With both men having become too dazed and tired to come out of their corners, Duffy declared the match a no contest. Burke broke all the bones in both of his hands and was bedridden for six weeks. He had considered retiring after the fight but chose to continue competing. Bowen fought four more times after the fight. The club where the fight took place would burn to the ground four years later.

Last fight and death
Bowen's fight against Kid Lavigne was his 27th and last fight. The injury that killed him was inflicted in the 18th round, when Lavigne knocked him down and he hit his head on the wooden canvas. Bowen never regained consciousness and died at 7:00 am the next morning, aged 27. At first Lavigne was arrested for Bowen's death, but was found to be innocent of any wrongdoing following a coroner's inquest. Bowen's death was listed as from hitting his head on the ring floor.

References

External links
 http://www.boxrec.com/media/index.php?title=Human:64402
 http://cyberboxingzone.com/boxing/bowen-andy.htm
 

1867 births
1894 deaths
American male boxers
Boxers from Louisiana
Deaths due to injuries sustained in boxing
Lightweight boxers
Sports deaths in Louisiana